Vincent Marcel (born 9 April 1997) is a French professional footballer who plays as a midfielder for Bulgarian club Hebar Pazardzhik.

Club career

Nice
Marcel is a youth exponent from Le Havre AC. He made his Ligue 1 debut for OGC Nice on 14 August 2016 against Stade Rennais.

Vitória Guimarães
On 2 September 2019, Vitória Guimarães announced the signing of Marcel.

Lokomotiv Plovdiv
In July 2021 he joined Bulgarian club Lokomotiv Plovdiv.

Hebar Pazardzhik
In August 2022 Marcel signed a contract with another Bulgarian team - newly promoted Hebar Pazardzhik.

Career statistics

Club

References

External links
 
 
 

1997 births
Living people
Association football midfielders
French footballers
France youth international footballers
Guadeloupean footballers
Ligue 1 players
Ligue 2 players
Primeira Liga players
First Professional Football League (Bulgaria) players
OGC Nice players
ES Troyes AC players
Vitória S.C. B players
PFC Lokomotiv Plovdiv players
French expatriate footballers
French expatriate sportspeople in Portugal
Expatriate footballers in Portugal
French expatriate sportspeople in Bulgaria
Expatriate footballers in Bulgaria